The ÖFB-Frauenliga (German for "ÖFB Women League") is the top level women's football league of Austria. Since 2002 the champion qualifies for the UEFA Women's Champions League.

In the 2000s SV Neulengbach dominated the league, winning the championships for twelve consecutive years (from 2003 until 2014). Since then St. Pölten have emerged as the league's dominant team and have won five titles in a row.

Format 
From the 2010-11 season onwards the 10 teams play each other twice, once home and once away.

For three years, 2007-08 to 2009-10, a play-off system was played. The teams played a round robin (9 games each) for the regular season. After that, there are two playoff groups, the championship group with places 1 to 5, and the relegation group with places 6 to 10. At the start of those the points accumulated during the regular season are halved (and rounded up if necessary). Each play-off round then plays a double round robin. The winner of the championship group was the champion. Last place of the relegation group got relegated into the 2nd division. The winners of the three divisions of the 2. Frauenliga played a promotion group. They play each other once, the team which is leading the standings after that got promoted to the ÖFB-Frauenliga.

Current Teams 2022-23 Season 

SPG SCR Altach/FFC Vorderland
Altenmarkt
Austria Wien
Bergheim
First Vienna
Kleinmünchen/BW Linz
SV Neulengbach
SKN St. Pölten
Sturm Graz 
Wacker Innsbruck

List of champions 
The list of champions:

Titles by team

Top scorers
Top scorers since 1998.

References

External links
 League at ÖFB.at
 League at uefa.com
 Bundesliga at women.soccerway.com

 
Aus
Football leagues in Austria
Women's football competitions in Austria
Sports leagues established in 1973
Women's sports leagues in Austria
1973 establishments in Austria
Football
Professional sports leagues in Austria